Aphonopelma truncatum is a species of spider in the family Theraphosidae, found in Mexico.

References

truncatum
Spiders described in 1897
Spiders of Mexico